Maverick, Maveric or Maverik may refer to:

History
 Maverick (animal), an unbranded range animal, derived from U.S. cattleman Samuel Maverick

Aviation
 AEA Maverick, an Australian single-seat sportsplane design
 General Aviation Design Bureau T-32 Maverick, a Ukrainian ultralight trike design
 I-Fly Maverick, a US powered-parachute flying vehicle under development by the Indigenous People's Technology and Education Center
 Murphy Maverick, a Canadian light aircraft design
 AGM-65 Maverick, a US guided air-to-surface missile
 Airbus MAVERIC (Model Aircraft for Validation and Experimentation of Robust Innovative Controls), a European sub-scale blended wing body prototype

Computing
 Maverick Framework, a model-view-controller framework for Java
 Maverick Meerkat, the version 10.10 of Ubuntu
 OS X Mavericks, the tenth major release of Apple's OS X operating system

Film and television
 The Maverick, a 1952 Western film starring Wild Bill Elliott
 Maverick (TV series), an American western series starring James Garner and Jack Kelly
 Maverick (film), a 1994 film based on the television series, starring Mel Gibson, Jodie Foster, and James Garner
 Maverick, callsign of Pete Mitchell in the Top Gun film series, played by Tom Cruise
 Top Gun: Maverick, a 2022 sequel to the film Top Gun

Literature
 Maverick! (book), an autobiography by Ricardo Semler
 Maverick (comics), a comic-book imprint, series, and several characters
 Maverick (Dark Horse), a defunct imprint of Dark Horse Comics
 Maverick (magazine), a defunct South African business magazine
 Maverick, a 1990 science fiction novel by Bruce Bethke in the Isaac Asimov's Robots and Aliens series
 Maverick: Extraordinary Women from South Africa's Past, a 2005 book by Lauren Beukes
 Maverick: A Biography of Thomas Sowell, a 2021 book by Jason L. Riley

Music
 The Mavericks, an American country music band
 Anders Lundström or Maverick, Swedish record producer and songwriter 
 Fender Maverick, a guitar

Albums
 Maverick (George Thorogood and the Destroyers album), 1985
 Maverick (Hank Williams, Jr. album), 1992
 Maverick (Meg album) or the title song, 2010
 Maverick (single album), by the Boyz, or the title song, 2021
 Maverick (soundtrack), from the 1994 film
 Mavericks (Peter Holsapple and Chris Stamey album), 1991
 Mavericks, by Johnossi, 2010
 The Mavericks (1990 album), by the Mavericks
 The Mavericks (2003 album), by the Mavericks

Songs
 "Maverick" (song), by D'espairsRay, 2003
 "Mavericks", by Ubiquitous Synergy Seeker, 2010

Organizations
 Maverick (company), an American entertainment company with several divisions, including Maverick Records and Maverick Films
 Maverick (management), an American music management group
 Maverick Entertainment Group, a film distributor
 Maverick Entertainment, a UK company whose productions include Snailsbury Tales
 Maverik, Inc., a convenience store chain owned by FJ Management
 Maverik Lacrosse, an American lacrosse equipment and apparel company
 Maverick Technologies, an American industrial automation company

People

 Maverick (name), surname or given name
 Matt Bentley (born 1979), "Maverick Matt", American professional wrestler
 Smedley Butler (1881–1940), the "Maverick Marine", US Marine Corps officer
 Hossein Khalatbari (1949–1985), "Hossein the Maverick", Iranian air force pilot

Products
 Maverick (chocolate), a discontinued chocolate bar manufactured by Nestle in the UK
 Maverick (cigarette), a brand of cigarettes manufactured by Lorillard Tobacco Company
 Mossberg Maverick, a shotgun model
 Maverick, a brand of jeans owned by VF Corporation
 Maverick REV-6, a 2005 Nerf blaster released under the N-Strike series
 Maverick, a clothing brand by Logan Paul

Places
 Maverick (MBTA station), a subway station in Boston, Massachusetts, U.S.
 Maverick County, Texas, U.S.
 Maverick Stadium, at the University of Texas at Arlington, U.S.
 Maverick Theater, a storefront theater in Fullerton, California, U.S.
 Mavericks, California, U.S., coastal location of the Mavericks surfing contest

Sports
 Calgary Mavericks, a Canadian rugby union team from Calgary, Alberta, Canada
 Mönchengladbach Mavericks, an American football club from Mönchengladbach, Germany
 Saracens Mavericks, a netball team based in Hertfordshire, England

United States
 Clermont Mavericks, a wood bat collegiate summer baseball league team in Clermont, Florida
 Colorado Mesa Mavericks, the sports teams of Colorado Mesa University
 Dallas Mavericks, an NBA basketball team from Dallas, Texas
 Denver Mavericks, a defunct minor league ice hockey team in Denver, Colorado
 High Desert Mavericks, a minor league baseball team in Adelanto, California
 Houston Mavericks, a defunct American Basketball Association team in Houston, Texas
 Mid-Missouri Mavericks, a minor league baseball team from Columbia, Missouri
 Minnesota State Mavericks, the sports teams of Minnesota State University, Mankato
 Missouri Mavericks, a Central Hockey League team from Independence, Missouri
 Omaha Mavericks, the sports teams of the University of Nebraska Omaha
 Portland Mavericks, a defunct minor league baseball team in Portland, Oregon
 Tucson Mavericks a defunct minor league ice hockey team in Tucson, Arizona
 UT Arlington Mavericks, the sports teams of the University of Texas at Arlington
 Yakima Mavericks, a minor league football team from Yakima, Washington
 Mavericks, the mascot of James Madison High School, in San Antonio, Texas
 Mavericks, the mascot of Mauldin High School
 Mavericks, the mascot of McNeil High School, in Austin, Texas
 Mavericks, the mascot of Mercy College, in Dobbs Ferry, New York
 Mavericks, the mascot of Moore Catholic High School, in Staten Island, New York
 Mavericks, the mascot of Montrose School, in Medfield, Massachusetts
 Mavericks, the mascot of Moses Montefiore Academy, Chicago, Illinois
 Mavericks, the mascot of Mountainside High School in Beaverton, Oregon

Transport
 Maverick (armored vehicle), internal armed security vehicle for Peacekeeping forces
 Maverick station, subway station in Boston
 Ford Maverick (disambiguation), the name of five different automobiles made by the Ford Motor Company
 SS Maverick, an American oil tanker

Other uses
 Maverick (genetics), a type of transposable genetic element also known as a polinton
 Maverick (Mega Man), a term to describe irregular behavior of robots in the Mega Man X video game series
 Maverick (pinball), a game based on the 1994 film
 Maverick (roller coaster), at Cedar Point amusement park in Sandusky, Ohio, U.S.

See also
 
 
 Maverik Center, indoor arena in West Valley City, Utah, U.S., named for Maverik, Inc.
 Maverik Stadium, stadium at Utah State University in Logan, Utah, U.S., also named for Maverik, Inc.